Hendon Factory Platform was a short-lived railway station in Hendon which opened in 1918 before closing in 1919. The station was on a short spur line from the Midland Main Line and was operated by the Midland Railway.

References

Disused railway stations in the London Borough of Brent
Former Midland Railway stations
Railway stations in Great Britain opened in 1918
Railway stations in Great Britain closed in 1919
Hendon